Yelena Vinogradova (born 28 March 1964) is a female track and field athlete who represented the Soviet Union. She specialized in the 200 metres and often ran relay races, winning the silver medal in the 4 × 100 metres relay and placing eighth in the 200 m at the 1991 World Championships. She won a gold medal in the women's 4 × 400 metres relay at the 1990 Goodwill Games.

International competitions

References

1964 births
Living people
Soviet female sprinters
Universiade bronze medalists for the Soviet Union
Universiade medalists in athletics (track and field)
Goodwill Games medalists in athletics
World Athletics Championships athletes for the Soviet Union
World Athletics Championships medalists
European Athletics Championships medalists
Soviet Athletics Championships winners
Medalists at the 1987 Summer Universiade
Medalists at the 1989 Summer Universiade
Competitors at the 1990 Goodwill Games